Dorris Creek is a stream in Barton County in the U.S. state of Missouri.

Dorris Creek has the name of the local Dorris family which settled there.

See also
List of rivers of Missouri

References

Rivers of Barton County, Missouri
Rivers of Missouri